The Khosr River (Nahr al-Khosr) was a tributary of the Tigris River which ran directly through the centre of the ancient city of Nineveh in Northern Mesopotamia. During the reign of Sennacherib, walls were built along the banks of the Khosr to prevent it from flooding.

See also 

 Nineveh
 Tigris River

References

Assyrian geography
Former rivers
Tributaries of the Tigris River